William Anthony Richardson (August 27, 1795 – April 20, 1856) was an early California entrepreneur, influential in the development of Yerba Buena, the forerunner of the city of San Francisco.

Richardson was the first to receive a land grant in the city, deeded to him by the alcalde, José Joaquín Estudillo. He was subsequently granted the Rancho Saucelito, an even larger rancho land holding across San Francisco Bay comprising a large portion of present-day southeastern Marin County.  On these lands, he founded the city of Sausalito.

Life
Richardson arrived as second mate aboard the British whaling ship Orion in San Francisco Bay in 1822, shortly after Mexico had won its independence from Spain. An English mariner who had picked up a fluency in Spanish during his travels, he jumped ship after meeting and dancing with a local woman, Maria Antonia Martinez, at an all-night fiesta. He quickly became an influential presence in the now-Mexican territory. By 1825, Richardson had assumed Mexican citizenship, converted to Roman Catholicism and married Maria Antonia Martinez (1803–1887), the eldest daughter of Ygnacio Martinez, commandant of the Presidio of San Francisco and, in 1842, grantee of Rancho El Pinole. His ambitions now expanding to land holdings of his own; Richardson submitted a petition to Governor Echeandía for a rancho on the headlands across the Golden Gate from the Presidio, to be called "Rancho Saucelito". The Spanish word saucelito is believed to refer to a small cluster of willows, a moist-soil tree, indicating the presence of a freshwater spring and/or creek (possibly Coyote Creek).

Even before filing his claim, Richardson had used the fresh-water source to establish a watering station on the shores of what is now the town of Sausalito, selling fresh water to visiting vessels. Between Sausalito and the Tiburon Peninsula to the north is an inlet of San Francisco Bay, now called Richardson Bay, which formed part of the northern limit to Richardson's claim. However, his ownership of the land was legally tenuous: other claims had been submitted for the same region, and, at any rate, Mexican law reserved headlands for military uses, not private ownership. Richardson temporarily abandoned his claim and settled instead outside the Presidio, building the first two-story wood-frame house in the area and laying out the street plan for the pueblo of Yerba Buena (the old plaza is now Portsmouth Square). The small settlement was intended as a trading post and resupply point for ships visiting San Francisco Bay. Richardson's seafaring experience was instrumental in his also being appointed Port Captain, responsible for overseeing maritime commerce and often personally piloting arriving ships to their anchorage.

After years of lobbying and legal wrangling, Richardson was given clear title to all  of Rancho Saucelito on February 11, 1838. By 1841, he had sold his holdings across the bay and taken possession of the rancho, while still serving as port captain of Yerba Buena. He had financial problems in his later years and died in bankruptcy.

Legacy
Richardson Bay and Richardson Ave. in San Francisco's Marina District are named for William Richardson. Richardson Street is one of five consecutive streets in Martinez, California named for the sons-in-law of Don Ygnacio Martinez (whose land grant included the area that became the City of Martinez).

On June 12, 1937, the Daughters of the California Pioneers dedicated a bronze tablet to the memory of Richardson, as the first settler in Yerba Buena in 1835, at Richardson Avenue and the entrance to the Presidio of San Francisco. The tablet was unveiled by the great, great grandson of Richardson, James T. Davis. Major Angelo Joseph Rossi, Lewis Francis Byington, and others participated in the ceremonies.

References

[New York Times, letter to the editor by Joseph Carter, New York, NY, Sunday, April 6, 1997 (page 10)]

California pioneers
Businesspeople from California
19th-century American landowners
1795 births
1856 deaths
American city founders
19th-century English businesspeople
Mexican businesspeople
Naturalized citizens of Mexican California
English emigrants to Mexico
Mexican people of English descent
People from Sausalito, California
People from the San Francisco Bay Area
Sausalito, California
19th-century American businesspeople